Yuraq Urqu (Quechua yuraq white, urqu mountain, "white mountain", also spelled Yurac Orcco) is a  mountain in the Andes of Peru. It is located in the Arequipa Region, Arequipa Province, Tarucani District, and in the Moquegua Region, General Sánchez Cerro Province, Ubinas District. Yuraq Urqu lies east of Piñani Lake (Peñane).

References 

Mountains of Arequipa Region
Mountains of Moquegua Region
Mountains of Peru